Ferenc Fister (born 23 February 1940) is a Hungarian footballer. He played in one match for the Hungary national football team in 1965.

References

External links
 

1940 births
Living people
Hungarian footballers
Hungary international footballers
Sportspeople from Székesfehérvár
Association football midfielders
Vasas SC players
Fehérvár FC players